Hoya curtisii is a species of flowering plant in the genus Hoya. It is native to Southeast Asia across Thailand, the Philippines, Borneo, and Malaysia. The species has easily recognizable foliage among Hoyas with small, pointed leaves and silver variegation. Like many Hoyas, it grows as a creeping epiphyte.

References

curtisii
curtisii
Plants described in 1908